This is a list of transfers in Dutch football for the 2009 Winter transfer window. Only moves featuring an Eredivisie side and/or an Eerste Divisie side are listed.

The winter transfer window opened on January 1, 2009, and closed on February 2. Deals may be signed at any given moment in the season, but the actual transfer may only take place during the transfer window. Unattached players may sign at any moment.

Eredivisie

ADO Den Haag

In:

Out:

Ajax

In:

Out:

AZ

In:

Out:

Feyenoord

In:

Out:

De Graafschap

In:

Out:

FC Groningen

In:

Out:

SC Heerenveen

In:

Out:

Heracles Almelo

In:

Out:

NAC Breda

In:

Out:

NEC

In:

Out:

PSV

In:

Out:

Roda JC

In:

Out:

Sparta Rotterdam

In:

Out:

FC Twente

In:

Out:

FC Utrecht

In:

Out:

Vitesse Arnhem

In:

Out:

FC Volendam

In:

Out:

Willem II

In:

Out:

Eerste Divisie

AGOVV Apeldoorn

In:

Out:

SC Cambuur

In:

Out:

FC Den Bosch

In:

Out:

FC Dordrecht

In:

Out:

FC Eindhoven

In:

Out:

FC Emmen

In:

Out:

Excelsior

In:

Out:

Fortuna Sittard

In:

Out:

Go Ahead Eagles

In:

Out:

HFC Haarlem

In:

Out:

Helmond Sport

In:

Out:

MVV

In:

Out:

FC Omniworld

In:

Out:

RBC Roosendaal

In:

Out:

RKC Waalwijk

In:

Out:

Telstar

In:

Out:

TOP Oss

In:

Out:

BV Veendam

In:

Out:

VVV-Venlo

In:

Out:

FC Zwolle

In:

Out:

See also
 Football in the Netherlands
 Transfer window

References

Football Transfers Winter 2008-09
Football Transfers Winter 2008-09
2008-09
Netherlands